The 2010–11 season was Oțelul Galați's 19th consecutive season in the Liga I, and its 22nd overall season in the top-flight of Romanian football. It was the first season with new shirt supplier Masita.

Oțelul's primary objective will be to obtain a qualifying spot for the 2011–2012 season of Europa League.

Overview
The previous season of Liga I ended on May 22 and the players went on vacation. On June 10 the team returned from holiday, with two new faces: Laurenţiu Buş, which returned from a 6-month loan from Arieşul Turda, team from which he was initially bought in January 2010 but loaned back to finish the season there, and Georgian Butoi – a youth player signed up from Farul Constanţa.

The team trained in Galați for a few days and on June 13 they left for a training camp in Poiana Braşov. During the time spent there Csaba Borbély was signed while N'Kongue, Goločevac, Siminic and Nikolić left the team. Due to the ongoing economical crisis Oțelul tried to talk some players into cutting down their wages, with players like Paraschiv, Viglianti and Perendija accepting. The mountain training-camp ended on June 26.

The team reunited again in Galați on June 28 where they started training again. The following day, club president Marius Stan announced that ticket prices went up because the club needs money to continue or start new investments – especially the floodlights system, feature without which the team will not be able to play Liga I matches on home ground.

The team was set for another training camp, this time in Germany, between 2 and 15 July.

Players

Transfers

In

Out

Player statistics

Squad statistics

Start formations

Disciplinary records

Suspensions

Club

Coaching staff

Kit

|
|

Competitions

Overall

{|class="wikitable" style="text-align: center;"
|-
!
!Total
! Home 
! Away
|-
|align=left| Games played || 35 || 17 || 18
|-
|align=left| Games won  || 21 || 12 || 9
|-
|align=left| Games drawn|| 7 || 5 || 2
|-
|align=left| Games lost || 7 || – || 7
|-
|align=left| Biggest win|| 4–1 vs Urziceni || 4–1 vs Urziceni || 3–0 vs Urziceni
|-
|align=left| Biggest loss ||  0–4 vs FC Vaslui || – || 0–4 vs FC Vaslui
|-
|align=left| Clean sheets || 17 || 8 || 9
|-
|align=left| Goals scored || 47 || 29 || 18
|-
|align=left| Goals conceded|| 27 || 12 || 15
|-
|align=left| Goal difference || +20 || +17 || +3
|-
|-
|-
|align=left| Yellow cards   || 82 || 42 || 40
|-
|align=left| Red cards      || 4 || 3 || 1
|-
|align=left| Most appearances || colspan=3|  Râpă (34)
|-
|align=left| Most minutes played ||colspan=3|  Râpă (3201)
|-
|align=left| Top scorer     || colspan=3| Pena (8)
|-
|align=left| Top assister   || colspan=3| Viglianti (7)
|-
|align=left| Points         || 70/105 (%) || 41/51 (%) || 29/54 (%)
|-
|align=left| Winning rate   || % || % || %
|-

Liga I

League table

Results summary

Results by round

Points by opponent

Source: FCO

Matches
Kickoff times are in EET.

Cupa României

Friendlies
Germany training camp

Cyprus training camp

References

See also
FC Oțelul Galați
2010–11 Liga I
2010–11 Cupa României

2010-11
Romanian football clubs 2010–11 season
2010-11